Charles McDonald (25 August 186013 November 1925) was an Australian politician who served in the House of Representatives from 1901 until his death, representing the Labor Party. He was Speaker of the House of Representatives from 1910 to 1913 and from 1914 to 1917. Before entering federal politics, McDonald had served in the Queensland Legislative Assembly from 1893 to 1901.

Early life and career

Charles McDonald was born in North Melbourne, Victoria. He lived a transient life as a child with his family living in four colonies. He was living in Mudgee, New South Wales, when he left school, becoming an apprentice printer. However, he later switched trades becoming a watchmaker.

Queensland Labor movement

McDonald was a watchmaker in Charters Towers in 1890 when he became the President of the Australian Labor Federation based in Brisbane. He played a leading role in the formation of the Australian Labor Party in Queensland.

McDonald was elected in 1893 as member for Flinders in the Legislative Assembly of Queensland. McDonald became known for his mastery of the Standing Orders. He was a member of the Queensland Executive between 1898 and 1903.

Federal parliamentarian

In 1901, he successfully stood for the Division of Kennedy, a vast seat in the outback of western Queensland, in the first election for the Australian House of Representatives after Federation. McDonald was known as "Fighting Charlie" or "Fighting Mac"  for his vigorous campaigning style.

McDonald became Chairman of Committees between 1906 and 1910. He became the first Labor Speaker in 1910 as Andrew Fisher formed the first Labor majority Government. He served in that position until Labor was narrowly defeated in the 1913 Federal election. McDonald was a confirmed republican who abandoned the traditional Speaker's wig and gown in favour of an ordinary business suit.  All Labor Speakers have followed this tradition.  He also removed the mace from the table.

The Liberal Government, which had only a slim majority, made an offer to McDonald to continue in the position, but he declined due to the interests of the Labor Party.

The Liberal Prime Minister Joseph Cook became frustrated by the Labor controlled Senate blocking his legislation and called for a double dissolution election. Labor won the election and McDonald became speaker again in 1914. He served as Speaker under the Labor, National Labor, and Nationalist governments until the 1917 election. During the parliamentary term, Labor split over the introduction of conscription in Australia. After the election, McDonald served on the opposition backbench.

His health was failing in the mid-1920s despite a trip to the United Kingdom in 1923. He died of cerebro-vascular disease on the day before the 1925 election, leading to his opponent Grosvenor Francis being declared elected unopposed.

McDonald had a state funeral and was buried in Boroondara General Cemetery. He was survived by his wife and daughter.

References

1860 births
1925 deaths
Australian Labor Party members of the Parliament of Australia
Members of the Queensland Legislative Assembly
Members of the Australian House of Representatives for Kennedy
Members of the Australian House of Representatives
Speakers of the Australian House of Representatives
Burials in Victoria (Australia)
20th-century Australian politicians